An 81 mm mortar is a medium-weight mortar. It is a smooth-bore, muzzle-loading, high-angle-of-fire weapon used for long-range indirect fire support to light infantry, air assault, and airborne units across the entire front of a battalion zone of influence. 

Many countries use or used an 81 mm mortar in their armed forces. Examples are:
 Canada - L16 81mm mortar
 Finland – 81 KRH 71 Y
 France – Brandt Mle 27/31
 Germany – Granatwerfer 34
 Greece – E44-E 81 mm Mortar
 Italy – Mortaio da 81/14 Modello 35
 Myanmar – BA-90 and MA-8
 United Kingdom – L16 81mm mortar
 United States – M252 mortar
Turkey – MKE 81mm UT1 & MKE 81mm NT1

Warsaw Pact countries and China use a similar 82 mm caliber for the same purpose.

References

See also 
 :Category:81mm mortars
 :Category:82 mm artillery

Infantry mortars